Isidiella divitella is a moth in the family Cosmopterigidae. It is found in France, on the Iberian Peninsula, Corsica and Sardinia.

The wingspan is 11–12 mm. It has a white head, gold and white thorax, and a white abdomen. The wings are golden brown and white.

The larvae feed on Helichrysum italicum, Helichrysum italicum serotinum, Helichrysum stoechas and Santolina species. They mine the leaves of their host plant. The larvae constructs a globular cocoon which is attached to the stem of the host plant. From this cocoon, silk tubes are made from nearby leaves, which are mined. Pupation takes place in this cocoon. Larvae can be found from July to August.

Similar species
Isidiella nickerlii has an almost identical wing pattern and shape. The most obvious difference between I. divitella and I. nickerlii is the white head of I. divitella.

References

Moths described in 1885
Cosmopteriginae
Moths of Europe